Postcolonial Love Poem is a poem collection by Natalie Diaz which is her second collection.

Awards 

 Pulitzer Prize for Poetry

Finalist or Shortlist in 
 National Book Award for Poetry 
 Los Angeles Times Book Prize for Poetry.
 Forward Prize for Best Collection
 T. S. Eliot Prize

References 

Pulitzer Prize for Poetry-winning works